The Kharchin, or Kharachin, is a subgroup of the Mongols residing mainly (and originally) in North-western Liaoning and Chifeng, Inner Mongolia. There are Khalkha-Kharchin Mongols in Dorno-Gobi Province (Kharchin Örtöö was part of the province during Qing rule) and in Ulaanbaatar, Mongolia.

They are descended directly from the Kharchin tümen of the Northern Yuan dynasty. The Kharchin tümen consisted of:

 Yünshebü tümen
 Southern branch of Doyan Uriankhai
 Eastern branch of Mongoljin-Tümed

The eastern Tümed (Chaoyang county, Liaoning) and Mongoljin (Fuxin county, Liaoning) trıbes were also categorized as Kharchin traditionally.

Location and population 

 Kharchin Banner (Former Kharchin Right Banner, Josotu League), Chifeng or Juu Uda City, Inner Mongolia, the Mongolian population: 132,000 (2006)
 Ningcheng County (Former Kharchin Middle Banner, Josotu League), Chifeng or Juu Uda City, Inner Mongolia, the Mongolian population: 68,000 (2006)
 Kharchin Left Mongolian Autonomous County (Former Kharchin Left Banner, Josotu league), Chaoyang City, Liaoning province, the Mongolian population: 80,900 (2000)
 Fuxin Mongol Autonomous County (Former Tümed Left or Mongoljin Banner, Josotu League), Liaoning Province, the Mongolian population: 220,400 (2000)
 Chaoyang County and Beipiao County (Former Tümed Right Banner, Josotu League), Chaoyang City, Liaoning Province, the Mongolian population: Chaoyang 31,800(200) Beipiao 30,600 (2000)

Exact population data of the Kharchins in China is difficult to obtain because there was a great immigration of the Kharchins for Jindandao ethnic conflict during the late Qing dynasty, and that the former Josotu league was divided after the Qing dynasty and now belongs to the present three different provinces: Inner Mongolia, Liaoning and Heibei. However, there are Liaoning's ethnic Mongols with over 600,000 population and Heibei's ethnic Mongols with over 100,000 population, both of whom are mainly originated from the Kharchins except the smaller Mongol groups with Chahar, Barga, Oirad or other ethnic origins.

Brief history 
The term Kharchin first appeared in the history of the Yuan dynasty. In the early 13th century, the Kipchaks and the Qanqlis surrendered to the Mongol Empire. Because they were famous for distilling khara-airag (black kumis), they were called Kharachin by the Mongols. Those Turkic peoples formed the kheshig in the Yuan dynasty after 1270. Because they formed a minority of the Mongol Yuan dynasty, they quickly assimilated with the Mongols and other groups.

By 15th century the Kharchins had formed part of Yungshiyebu tümen, inhabiting Chahar territory. In 1389 the Ming dynasty established the Doyin Uriankhain Guard in modern-day Inner Mongolia. After 1448 they resettled much closer to the Ming border. Around 1600 Kharchins moving east merged with the Doyin Uriankhai Mongols. They submitted to the Qing dynasty in 1626, and was organized into three Kharchin banners in Josogtu league, each ruled by a ruler of the Uriankhai lineage.

In the early 20th century, Prince Gungsangnorbu of the right Kharchin expanded modern education among the Mongols. The Kharchins dominated Republic of China's Mongol bureaucracy at the time. After 1945 the People's Republic of China set up new Kharchin banners outside Inner Mongolia. In 1955 the Right Kharachin (Kharchin) banner was transferred to Inner Mongolia as Kharchin banner while their central banner was abolished. The Kharchin left banner became an autonomous country in 1957.

Ethnic origins 

According to a Kharchin folk legend, the Kharchin Mongols are originated from the three sub-groups: the Bornuud, the Sharnuud and the Harnuud.
Bor means brown in Mongolian, and Borjigin is the family name of Genghis Khan, the Bornuud Kharchin should refer to the Yünshebü tümen (and Mongoljin-Tümed tümen) led by the successors of Genghis Khan.
Shar means "yellow" in Mongolian and the Uriankhai were often called as the Yellow-head Uriankhai by other Mongols, the Sharnuud Kharchin should refer to the Doyan Uriankhai led by the famous Uriankhai general Zelme and his successors.
Khar means "black" in Mongolian, and the Khitans were often named as Khara Khitans by themselves and others, the Kharnuud Kharchin should refer to the descendants of the Khitan Liao dynasty, consisted of the aboriginal Khitans and a few absorbed ethnic groups such as Jurchen and Han Chinese.

Kharchin historian Lomi gave another different explanation for the Bornuud and the Sharnuud, the Sharnuud were people of Genghis Khan and the Bornuud were people of General Zelme according to his book "The History of Borjigits" (mongɣul-un borǰigid obuɣ-un teüke) written in 1732. 
 
There is an analysis on the Kharchin's three ethnic origins. The ethnic origins of the eastern Tümed and Mongoljin will be discussed about under the topic of the Mongoljin-Tümed tümen.

Yunshebu Tümen 

The Yunsheebuu Tümen consisted of the three sub-tribes: Kharchin, Asud and Yunsheebuu itself. It was one of the right wing of the eastern Mongols ruled by Dayan Khan and his successors. The Yunsheebuu Tümen or its original tribal alliance was the largest and the most powerful one among the eastern Mongol tribes before Dayan Khan regained the golden family's ruling power on the Mongols.

Many famous chief leaders of the court of the Northern Yuan dynasty based in Mongolia, such as the Asud's Arugtai Tayisi, the Kharchin's Bolai Tayisi, the Bekrin's Begersen Tayisi and Ismail Tayisi, Oirad's Ibarai Tayisi, were also the chieftains of the Yunsheebuu Tümen or its original tribes, and they depended on the power of Yunsheebuu to achieve their political aspiration. The Yunsheebuu Tümen during the rule of Begersen Tayisi consisted of at least ten sub-tribes: Asud, Kharchin, Sharnud, Tav Aimag, Dalandaganad, Khonghutan, Shibaguchin, Nomochin, Buryat and Barga.

Asud, Kharchin and Sharnud were known as the Huuchin or old Kharchin, who were the core tribes of the Yunsheebuu Tümen.
The Asuds originated from the Yuan Empire's royal guard troops of the Alans, the Asud's Arugtai Tayisi could be recognized as the first leader of the Yunsheebuu-Kharchin tribal alliance and one of the most important leaders during the Northern Yuan dynasty.

The Kharchin originated from the Kipchak guard troops served in Khanbalik or Dadu (today's Beijing, great capital of Yuan empire) and other Chinese areas, and also the Kipchak royal horse herder groups in the present Khovd Province and its neighborhood areas of Mongolia.
The Kipchaks got the name of Kharchin because their horse herders were famous for their tribute of horse milk wine to Yuan emperors, the Kharchin originally means people who brew black horse milk wine.
Some scholars also argue that the Kharchins were originated at least partly from the Khalaj of the historical Khorasan area in today's Iran and Afghanistan, who were a sub-group of the Oghuz or Arghu Turks.
The Kharchin's Bolai Tayisi was the successor of Arugtai Tayisi, he recovered the power of the eastern Mongols against the Oirads.

There are no the exact clues for the origins of the Sharnuud yet, but Yunsheebuu Tümen's Sharnuud should not be simply considered as yellow-head Uriankhai or others, while there are so many tribes like Uriankhai, Naiman and Buryat, that consisted of such a clan of the Sharnuud, even some of the Mongolized Uighurs were named as the Sharnuud too. The name of Sharnuud may suggest their non-Mongoloid physical characters, Yunsheebuu's Sharnuud seems some European looking group followed with the Alans and Kipchaks to serve for the Yuan court in Khanbalik (Dadu).

Shibaguchin and Nomochin were the original tribes of the Yunsheebuu before the Kharchin allied with them and adopted its name. The Shibaguchins were people who raised hawks as their occupation for the Mongol nobles. Numan means arch in Mongolian, the Nomochins were the royal arch artisans. Both Shibaguchins and Nomochins had multi-ethnic origins, they were served for the Yuan emperors when they went for hunting to the Tsagan Nuur moving imperial palace of Yuan empire's upper capital Xanadu (Kaiping), located in the present Plain Blue Banner, Shilingol League, Inner Mongolia. Yuan court set up Yunxufu to administer the moving imperial palace, It's believed that Shibaguchin and Nomochin adopted Yunsheebuu, the Yunxufu's alternative name in Mongolian, as their common tribal name after they evolved as a nomadic tribe on the steppes. 

Buryat and Barga, as a part of the Yunsheebuu Tümen, were different from their cousins in Siberian forest, Their ancestors immigrated from the forest to the western Mongolia steppes, and joined the Oirad alliance. It is surmised that Buryat and Barga were probably led by an important Oirad Chieftain Aragtemür. He ever struggled against Esen Khaan and defeated him finally. However, Bolai Tayisi defeated him later and absorbed his people of the Buryat and Barga into the Kharchins. It is also possible that Bekrin's Begersen Tayisi or Oirad's Ibalai Tayisi brought them into the Yunsheebuu.

Tav Aimag that means five tribes, were known as Jalair, Hongirad, Ihires, Manggud and Urugud, who immigrated from northern Mongolia to the Khitan steppes, the present Southeastern Inner Mongolia. But they retreated to the north steppes after the Yuan Empire lost its rule on China.
Hongirad and Ikhires were categorized as Darligin Mongols, Manggud and Urugud were categorized as Nirun Mongols, Jalair was a Mongolian speaking tribe.
The Tav Aimag were led by the Urugud's Orchuu to join the Kharchin, and he became the successor of Bolai tayisi after whom was defeated by the Onligud's Morihai Tayisi. Orchuu led the whole tribal alliance to immigrate to the southwestern Inner Mongolia, and they began to be considered as a branch of the right wing of the eastern Mongols.

Dalandaganad and Khonghutan were surmised as people of Bayanmönkh Jinong (assistant Khaan), who was father of Dayan Khan. Orchuu's daughter Sikher Taikhu was a queen of Bayanmönkh Jinong and the mother of Dayan Khan. The Bekrin's Begersen Tayisi immigrated from Uighurstan to Southwestern Mongolia, he defeated Orchuu there and became the leader of the Yungsiyebu Tümen. Begersen Tayisi also urged Manduul Khan to defeat and kill Bayanmönkh Jinong later, then the Dalandaganad and Khonghutan were absorbed as a part of the Yungsiyebu Tümen, and Begersen's cousin Ismail Tayisi married Queen Sikher Taikhu. Dayan Khan was saved by the Dalandaganad, and adopted by Queen Mandukhai of Manduul Khan later. The Dalandaganad were the descendants of the Tanggud (Тангуд), and the Khonghutans were a branch of the Nirun Mongols.

Bekrin originally inhabited in the Hami mountain area of the Uighurstan and its neighborhood areas. Mongols called them Uigurd, and considered them as the Mongolized Uighurs, however the original Bekrins seemed different compared to the real Uighurs. The Bekrins were one of the most important ethnic origins of the Yunsheebuu although Bekrin wasn’t listed as one of Yunsheebuu ten tribes during the time of Begersen tayisi. Some scholars considered the alliance between the Asud's Arugtai Tayisi and the Bekrin's Öljei Khan (the descendant of Ögedei Khan) as the basis of the Yunsheebuu Tümen. When Begersen Tayisi and Abarai Tayisi conquered the Yunsheebuu subsequently, they brought many more Bekrins into the Yunsheebuu Tümen.

Doyan Uriankhai 

In 1389, the Ming dynasty formed three guards for Mongol chiefs on the eastern slopes of the Khinggan. The Uriankhai clan formed the Doyin Guard (Doyan in Chinese language) on the Chaor River.

The core branch of the Doyan Uriankhai were people of the uls (kingdom) of King Eljitai, who was a son of Genghis Khan's younger brother Khajiun. According to Rashid al-Din, there were three larger tribes of the Naimans, the Tatars, the Uriankhai, and some unknown smaller ones in Eljitai Uls. An Uriankhai chieftain Chaurkhan (Чаурхан) who was cousin of General Zelme (Зэлмэ) and Subedei (Сүбэдэй), was appointed to be the chief general of Eljitai Uls by Genghis Khan. It was recorded that his troop consisted of 2000 Oirads soldiers. In 1280s, Eljitai's successors with other Mongol nobles led a rebellion against Khubilai Khaan, but it was finally repressed soon and those nobles were punished cruelly by Khubilai Khaan. The family of Eljitai lost their rule on their people after the rebellion, while the Uriankhai nobles controlled the ruling power on Uljitai Uls gradually. After Khubilai Khaan defeated Khaidu Khaan, the grandson of Ögedei Khaan, the Kyrgyz, the Ursuud (Урсууд) and the Khabkhanas (Хабханас) of Khaidu's Khanate, were compelled to immigrate to Uljitai Uls and joined the Doyan Uriankhai. A group of the Uriankhai was also appointed to guide the altar of Queen Hoelun, the mother of Chinggis Khaan. They seemed different from the Uriankhai of Uljitai Uls at first, but for unknown reasons they immigrated from the Uls of Queen Hoelun and her youngest son Temüge to join the Doyan Uriankhai and guarded the altar of Queen Hoelun in Ekh Doyan Öndör Mountain area, located in the today's Jalaid banner, Xing’an league, Inner Mongolia. We also noticed that almost all of Uriankhai families among the Kharchins claimed they were descendants of General Zelme but not Chaurkhan, that maybe suggested there is a larger population of the Uriankhai from Temüge Uls to join the Original Uriankhai tribe in Eljitai Uls.

Uriankhai had at least the two branches of the forest Uriankhai and the steppe Uriankhai during the time of Chinggis Khaan. The forest Uriankhai were appointed to guide Chinggis Khaan's mausoleum in the Burkhan mountain area and known as the Burkhan Uriankhai later, while a group of the steppe Uriankhai, known as Doyan Uriankhai, were appointed to guide the Queen Hoelun's altar on the Doyan mountain. There is no exact evidence about that the forest Uriankhai spoke Mongolian or Turkic yet, but the steppe Uriankhai had been categorized as a group of the Darligin Mongols after they immigrated from Siberian forest to the steppes. The two branches of the Uriankhai had a great influence on the later history of the Mongols after Yuan dynasty, A group of the Burkhan Uriankhai was probably one of the core ethnic origin of the Ordos Mongols of the right wing ruled by Jinong (assistance Khaan), and most of the Burkhan Uriankhai evolved as the Uriankhai Tümen of the left wing during the time of Dayan Khaan. After this tümen was destroyed, some of them fled to the north and maybe had the ethnic links with Tannu Uriankhai and Altai Uriankhai. The Doyan Uriankhai were conquered and absorbed by the Chakhar and the Inner Halha in the north, and by the Kharchins and the eastern Tümed and the Mongoljin in the south. The Zaruud (Зарууд) known as one of the Inner Khalkh were people of Doyan Uriankhai's Bagasun Tabunang (Багасун-Табунанг) who married Dayan Khaan's only daughter. Esen Khaan of the Choros (Чорос) Oirad also claimed him as the seventh generation offspring of Uriankhai General Zelme according to some historical resources.

Kyrgyz, Ursuud and Khabkhanas were originally the inhabitants of the Siberian forest (taiga). The Kyrgyz was a Turkic group who ever established the great Kyrgyz Khanate based on the former Uighur Khanate in the present north Mongolia, and their nomadic kingdom was destroyed by the Khitans a century later. Some of them immigrated back to their original homeland in the Siberia forest, and some leave there and were known as the Naimans and/or others on the later history. The Kyrgyz were absorbed into Doyan Uriankhai. There were also the Kherenugud (Xэрэнугуд), the Mongolized Kyrgyz tribes among the Oirds and the Ar Khalkh (Outer Khalkh). The Ursuud who were famous for their traditional medicine, and the Khabkhanas were the neighbors of the Kyrgyz. We have no the clues about their ethnic origins yet.

Naiman and Tatar were the main five tribes on the Mongol steppes during the time of Chinggis Khaan. The Naimans were surmised to have the ethnic links with people of the Kyrgyz Khanate in the north Mongolia. There was a Naiman tribe known as one of the eight aimags of the Tsakhar Tümen, their descendants inhabit in the present Naiman Banner, Tongliao, Inner Mongolia. Haichid, Hailasud, Garhata, Shiranud, Narad, Marud, Nuled and other family names of the Mongols were considered to link with the Naimans. The Tatars were a Mongolic tribe inhabited in the eastern Mongolia, there were the six sub-groups of the Tatars consisted of the Tutukliut, the Alji, the Chagan, the Kui, the Tarat, the Burqui according to Rashid al-Din. The Tsagan Tatars were also known as one of the eight aimags of the Tsakhar Tümen, and there are Tsagan Tatar, Alji and other family names originated from the Tatars among the Mongols today. The Naiman and Tsagan Tatar were probably absorbed by the Tsahar from the north branch of the Doyan Uriankhai like the Zaruud absorbed by the Inner Khalkh.

Descendants of the Liao dynasty 

The land inhabited by the Kharchins was also the homeland of the Khitans, a Mongolic group in eastern Mongolia. According to Rashid al-Din, there were 10 thousands families of the Western Liao dynasty which consisted of 93 thousands families in total during the time of Genghis Khan. The nomadic Khitans of their original homeland were recognized officially as the Mongols during Yuan dynasty too, Tav Aimags consisted of Jalair, Hongirad, Ikhires, Manggud and Urugud, led by General Muhulai to immigrate to the land of the Khitans and mixed with them. Doyan Uriankhai followed the Tav Aimags to immigrate to the Khitan steppes and became the lords of this land during the Northern Yuan dynasty, thus, the nomadic Khitans were absorbed by the Mongols gradually and didn’t exist as an independent ethnic group except that the Daur, a small modern Mongolic group, claimed their Khitan ethnic origin.

The Khitan as a large ethnic entity had a multi-origins too. The Khitan's cousin tribe, the Kumo Xi, were conquered and absorbed by the Khitans after they raised to the power. Both Khitan and Kumuci were originated from the Yuwen tribe of the Xianbei. The Yuwen was originally a Southern Xiongnu (Hsiung-nu) who immigrated from the present Southwestern Inner Mongolia to the eastern steppes inhabited by the Xianbei (and Wuhuan) and mixed with them there, that was similar to what happened to Yunsheebuu and Doyan Uriankhai later. The Tiele (the original Turks) of the northern steppes were also absorbed into the Khitans in part. The Khitans were categorized as the two groups of the Yelü who were the original Khitans and the imperial family of the Liao dynasty, and the Xiao who were originated from the two Shenmi (Yishiyi and Boli), the branches of the Tiele, and they were the tribes of the Khitan's queens. There were the eight Khitan's ancient tribes recorded by Chinese: Xiwandan, Hedahe, Fufuyu, Xiling, Rilian, Pijie, Li, Tuliuyu. And the Kumoci consisted of the five ancient tribes: Ruhuzhu, Mohefu, Qigu, Mukun, Shide.

It is also worthy to mention that a group of the Komuci who immigrated to the west after the Liao dynasty was destroyed by the Jin dynasty, were probably the ancestors of the royal family of the Kipchaks whom the Kharchin's Kipchaks were originated from.

Notable Kharchin Mongols 

 Güngsennorv - Noyan (chieftain) of Kharchin Left Banner of Qing, first founding-director of Mongolian and Tibetan Affairs Commission (founded 1912) of the Republic of China.
 Khaisan - One of the main supporters of the Bogd Khanate of Mongolia in 1911
 El Temür, De facto in Yuan dynasty (14th century)

See also 
 Mongols

References 

Mongols
Mongol peoples
Southern Mongols